The Woman in White is a 1912 American short silent film based on the 1860 novel of the same name by Wilkie Collins, produced by the Gem Motion Picture Company. Unlike a second film adaptation of The Woman in White produced by the Thanhouser Company the same year, it is not a lost film; a copy is preserved at the George Eastman Museum in Rochester, New York.

The Thanhouser version was one of the silent films destroyed when their initial studio burned in 1913.

Production
Directed by George Nichols, The Woman in White was produced by Gem, a subsidiary of the newly formed Universal Film Manufacturing Company and released on October 22, 1912.

The cast included Janet Salisbury (Laura Fairlie and The Woman in White), Charles Perley (Walter), Charles Craig (Percival), Alec Frank (Fosco), Viola Alberti (Countess Fosco) and Lyman Rabbe (Pesca). The story was adapted by George Edwardes Hall.

Thanhouser Company production
Simultaneously, the Thanhouser Company was producing its own two-reel adaptation of The Woman in White, starring Marguerite Snow (Laura, Anne), James Cruze (Percival) and William Garwood (Walter). The screenplay was written by Lloyd F. Lonergan. Release dates were announced to the press and changed several times as the two companies competed for the first release. In the end, Thanhouser was able to deliver its film on October 20, 1912—two days before Gem.

Gallery
A summary of the plot of The Woman in White appeared in the November 1912 issue of The Motion Picture Story Magazine, accompanied by six still photographs from the Gem production. The photographs are captioned as they appear in the magazine.

References

External links
 The Woman in White in The Motion Picture Story Magazine, November 1912 (pp. 49–56)
 The Woman in White filmography at Thanhouser Films: An Encyclopedia and History by Q. David Bowers
  (Gem Motion Picture Company)
  (Thanhouser Company)

American silent short films
1912 films
1912 drama films
Films based on British novels
Films based on works by Wilkie Collins
Lost American films
American black-and-white films
Silent American drama films
1912 lost films
Lost drama films
Films directed by George Nichols
1910s American films
American drama short films